The President is an album by American keyboardist and composer Wayne Horvitz released in 1987 on the German Dossier label.

Reception
Brian Olewnick awarded the album 4 stars on Allmusic and spoke favorably of the contributions by Bobby Previte, Elliott Sharp, and Bill Frisell.

Track listing
All compositions by Wayne Horvitz except where indicated
 "Goes Round and Round" - 4:13
 "Please Take That Train From My Door" - 4:34
 "From Town to Towm" - 2:53
 "One Bright Day" - 4:08 
 "Cadillac Ranch" - 4:08 
 "Gravity Falls" - 3:39
 "The Bean" - 3:04
 "The Donna Song" (Robin Holcomb) - 4:11 
 "Short of Breath" (Bobby Previte) - 4:45 
 "Early Risers" - 3:26

Personnel
Wayne Horvitz - keyboards, drum programming, harmonica
Elliott Sharp - guitar
Doug Wieselman - tenor saxophone, rhythm guitar
Bill Frisell - guitar
Bobby Previte - drums, drum programming, keyboards
Dave Hofstra - electric bass, tuba
Additional Musicians:
Robin Holcomb - keyboards (track 8)
Jim Mussen - Emulator drums operation 
Nica - vocals (track 6)
Jon Rose - unintentional cello (track 8)

References

Dossier Records albums
Wayne Horvitz albums
1987 albums